Speyside High School is a secondary school in Aberlour, Moray. It has 437 pupils. It serves the areas of Aberlour, Archiestown, Craigellachie, Dufftown, Rothes, Tomintoul and Glenlivet.

References

External links
 School website

Education in Moray
1976 establishments in Scotland
Educational institutions established in 1976